Plan 10 from Outer Space is a 1994 low budget science fiction film starring Karen Black  as Nehor and written and directed by Trent Harris.  The film is a surreal satire of Mormon theology. The film has no connection to Plan 9 from Outer Space (1957) other than its title and the fact that both films feature aliens.

This film premiered at the Sundance Film Festival in 1994 in the midnight madness category.  It also received the jury prize at the Raindance Film Festival in London in 1994.

Parts of the film were shot in Salt Lake City and the Great Salt Lake in Utah.

Notes and references

External links
 

1990s satirical films
1990s science fiction films
1994 films
American satirical films
Films about Mormonism
Films shot in Salt Lake City
Mormonism in fiction
1990s English-language films
1990s American films